The Association for the Advancement of Creative Musicians (AACM) is a nonprofit organization, founded in 1965 in Chicago by pianist Muhal Richard Abrams, pianist Jodie Christian, drummer Steve McCall, and composer Phil Cohran. The AACM is devoted "to nurturing, performing, and recording serious, original music," according to its charter. It supports and encourages jazz performers, composers and educators. Although founded in the jazz tradition, the group's outreach and influence has, according to Larry Blumenfeld, "touched nearly all corners of modern music."

Background
By the 1960s, jazz music was losing ground to rock music, and the founders of the AACM felt that a proactive group of musicians would add creativity and outlet for new music.  The AACM was formed in May 1965 by a group of musicians centered on pianist Muhal Richard Abrams, who had organized an Experimental Band since 1962. The musicians were generally steadfast in their commitment to their music, despite a lack of performance venues and sometimes indifferent audiences. From 1969 the AACM organised a music education program for inner-city youths. In the 1960s and 1970s AACM members were among the most important and innovative in all of jazz, though the AACM's contemporary influence has waned some in recent years.  Many AACM members have recorded widely: in the early days on the Delmark Records Avant Garde Jazz series and later on the Black Saint/Soul Note and India Navigation labels, and to a lesser extent on the Arista Records and ECM labels.

The musical endeavors of members of the AACM often include an adventurous mixing of avant-garde jazz, classical, and world music. The AACM also ran a school, The AACM School of Music, with classes in all areas taught by members of the AACM. The AACM also had a strong relationship with an influential sister organization, the Black Artists' Group (BAG) of St. Louis, Missouri.  The AACM has received aid from the MacArthur Foundation and has a strong relationship with Columbia College. A Power Stronger Than Itself: The AACM and American Experimental Music by George E. Lewis, has been published by the University of Chicago Press (May 2008).

In 2015, a 50-year retrospective exhibition of art, music and group-related artifacts, entitled, "Free at First", was held at the DuSable Museum of African American History.

Music
The AACM has been on the forefront of the avant-garde since its inception in 1965. Anthony Braxton, Henry Threadgill, and the Art Ensemble of Chicago pushed the boundaries of jazz and challenged the avant-garde classical movement led by John Cage. Concerts were heavily improvised, and many AACM members created scores that blended music, geometry, painting, and ciphers to be interpreted by the performers live. The AACM was part of an artistic movement on the South Side of Chicago that included AFRICobra (African Commune of Bad Relevant Artists) and other collectives.

Members 
(largely complete through at least 2015)  

 Muhal Richard Abrams
 
 
 
 
 Dee Alexander
 
 Frederick “Fred” Anderson 
 
 
 
 Harrison Bankhead 
 
 Thurman Barker 
 
 
 
 Mwata Bowden 
 
 Lester Bowie 
 
 Anthony Braxton
 
 Ari Brown 
 
 
 Jodie Christian
 Charles Clark 
 Chet
 
 Phil Kelan Cohran
 
 Iqua Colson 
 Pete Cosey 
 
 
 
 
 
 
 Ernest Khabeer Dawkins 
 
 Eugene “Gene” Dinwiddie
 
 
 
 
 
 Kahil El'Zabar 
 Douglas R. Ewart 
 Malachi Favors Maghostut 
 Alvin Fielder 
 
 Earl “Chico” Freeman
 
 
 
 
 
 
 
 
 
 
 
 Frederic J. “Fred” Hopkins 
 
 
 
 
 Frederick “Fred” Jackson
 
 
 Shaku Joseph Jarman 
 Leroy Jenkins
 
 
 
 
 
 
 
 
 George E. Lewis 
 
 Steven “Steve” McCall, IV
 Kalapurasha Ahrah Difdah/Maurice McIntyre 
 
 Nicole “Niki” Mitchell
 Roscoe Mitchell
 
 
 Famadou Don Moye 
 
 Amina Claudine Myers 
 Reggie Nicholson 
 
 
 
 
 Jeff Parker 
 
 John Powell
 
 
 
 Michael “Mike” Reed
 Tomeka Reid 
 Matana Roberts
 
 
 
 
 Rasul Siddik/Sadik 
 Wadada Leo Smith 
 
 John Stubblefield
 
 Henry Threadgill 
 Malachi Thompson
 
 
 Ann E. Ward
 
 
 Edward Wilkerson, Jr.

References

Further reading
 
 Reich, Howard. "Revolution in sound". Chicago Tribune. March 1, 2015, section 4, page 1.

External links
 Official site
 Profile in The New York Times May 2008
 Essay on "A Power Stronger Than Itself" at Sweet Pea Review

1965 establishments in Illinois
Artist groups and collectives based in Chicago
Jazz organizations
Arts organizations established in 1965